Azghyr, also known as Azgir, (Azğir, ازعير) is a village in Atyrau Region, southwest Kazakhstan.

References

Atyrau Region
Cities and towns in Kazakhstan